Home Truths (1999) is a novella by British author David Lodge. It was first written as a play of the same name, performed at the Birmingham Repertory Theatre in 1998.

Plot summary
The story mainly focuses on Adrian Ludlow, a half-retired writer, interviewed by Fanny Tarrant, a journalist famous for sarcastic portrait of her interviewees.

1999 British novels
Novels by David Lodge
British novellas
Novels about writers
Secker & Warburg books
Novels based on plays